This is a list of the winners of the Bavarian Film Awards Prize for best production design.

1979 Hans-Jürgen Syberberg
1980 Bengt von zur Mühlen
1993 Barbara Baum
2006 Uli Hanisch

References
 https://www.stmd.bayern.de/wp-content/uploads/2020/08/Bayerische-Filmpreisträger-bis-2020.pdf

Bavarian film awards